Irvin Humphrey "Irv" Eatman (born January 1, 1961) is a former American football offensive tackle, who played professionally for 3 seasons in the United States Football League (USFL) and 11 seasons with the National Football League (NFL).

Playing career

High school
Eatman attended Meadowdale High School in Dayton, Ohio where he starred in football and basketball.

College
A native of Birmingham, Alabama, Eatman attended UCLA where he was a two-time Lombardi Award semi-finalist, three-time honorable mention All-America and two-time All-Pac-10 selection. He played on the Bruins Rose Bowl Champion squad as a senior following the 1982 season.

USFL
Eatman was selected in the eighth round of the 1983 NFL Draft by the Kansas City Chiefs. However, he opted to join the USFL where he was a three-time USFL All-Pro offensive tackle (1983–1985) with the Philadelphia/Baltimore Stars. In 1984, Eatman was named USFL Man of the Year and was part of Stars squads which claimed USFL titles in both 1984 and 1985.

NFL
Eatman entered the NFL with a five-year stint in Kansas City (1986–1990) before playing six seasons with the New York Jets (1991–1992), the Los Angeles Rams (1993), the Atlanta Falcons (1994) and the Houston Oilers (1995–1996).

Coaching career
Irv Eatman joined the Oakland Raiders coaching staff (bay area) as co-offensive line coach. Eatman previously served as an assistant offensive line coach with the Kansas City Chiefs, the Green Bay Packers and the Pittsburgh Steelers.

Green Bay Packers (1999) AOL
Pittsburgh Steelers (2000) AOL
Kansas City Chiefs (2001-2005) AOL
Oakland Raiders (2006) Co-OL

References

1961 births
Living people
Players of American football from Birmingham, Alabama
Sportspeople from Birmingham, Alabama
Players of American football from Dayton, Ohio
American football offensive tackles
UCLA Bruins football players
Kansas City Chiefs players
New York Jets players
Los Angeles Rams players
Atlanta Falcons players
Houston Oilers players
Kansas City Chiefs coaches
Green Bay Packers coaches
Pittsburgh Steelers coaches
Oakland Raiders coaches
Philadelphia/Baltimore Stars players